Richard Levine may refer to:

 Richard Levine (architect),American environmental architect, solar energy and sustainability pioneer, and professor
 Richard Levine (director), American writer, director, actor and producer
 Richard M. Levine, American journalist and author
 Richard Levine (character), a character in the Jurassic Park novel The Lost World